Blonde was a French 32-gun privateer corvette, built in Bordeaux around 1801 and commissioned in 1803 under François Aregnaudeau. She preyed on British and American commerce, notably destroying the Royal Navy corvette HMS Wolverine, before the frigate HMS Loire captured her on 17 August 1804.

Privateer
Blonde started her career in June 1803 under François Aregnaudeau, a promising privateer captain noted for capturing several valuable ships off Dartmouth on Heureux Spéculateur.

Blonde had a successful cruise, notably capturing the former Royal Navy brig , by then commissioned as a whaling ship and returning to London from the South Seas Fisheries.

On 7 July Blonde encountered the British privateer , of 18 carriage guns and 50 men. The ensuing engagement lasted an hour and a half before Young Nicholas struck after she had suffered four men killed. Aregnaudeau gave her up to her captain and crew in recognition of their "courageous Conduct", and she arrived at Penzance on the 29th.

Culland's Grove was on her return leg from India and carried a valuable cargo amounting to 2.5 million francs in insurance money.

On 24 February 1804, Blonde departed from Santander, Spain, and in the following days captured the ships Diana, Eclipse, Sally and Rebecca, Rollindson, and Zephir. On 24 March she encountered an eight-ship convoy escorted by the corvette . Aregnaudeau attacked Wolverine and forced her to surrender. Wolverine sank almost immediately after striking. While Blondes crew was busy rescuing the survivors, the convoy attempted to escape. Still, Blonde managed to capture two ships, Nelson and Union. Blonde then returned to Pasaia, having captured a total of eight ships and 228 prisoners.

Denis Decrès ordered that the most deserving crew members of Blonde be honoured; Aregnaudeau received a sword of honour from the merchants of Bordeaux, and on 18 July 1804 he was made a Knight in the Legion of Honour.

Fate
On 16 August 1804, at coordinates , Blonde encountered the frigate HMS Loire. After a chase of 20 hours, including a running fight of a quarter of an hour, during which the British had one midshipman and five men wounded, and the French lost two men killed and five wounded, Blonde struck. Loire took her prize in tow to Plymouth where the prisoners were disembarked on 31 August.

Blonde was not commissioned in the Royal Navy.

Notes, citations, and references
Notes

Citations

References
 
 
  (Volume 1 and 2 in a single file)
 
 

1800s ships
Ships built in France
Maritime incidents in 1804
Privateer ships of France
Captured ships